Pennsylvania, officially the Commonwealth of Pennsylvania, is a state spanning the Mid-Atlantic, Northeastern, Appalachian, and Great Lakes regions of the United States. Pennsylvania borders Delaware to its southeast, Maryland to its south, West Virginia to its southwest, Ohio to its west, Lake Erie and the Canadian province of Ontario to its northwest, New York state to its north, and the Delaware River and New Jersey to its east.

Pennsylvania is the fifth-most populous state in the nation with over 13 million residents , its highest decennial count ever. The state is the 33rd-largest by area and ranks ninth among all states in population density. The southeastern Delaware Valley metropolitan area comprises and surrounds Philadelphia, the state's largest and nation's sixth-most populous city. Another 2.37 million reside in Greater Pittsburgh in the southwest, centered in and around Pittsburgh, the state's second-largest and Western Pennsylvania's largest city. The state's subsequent five most populous cities are: Allentown, Reading, Erie, Scranton, and Bethlehem. The state capital is Harrisburg.

Pennsylvania's geography is highly diverse: the Appalachian Mountains run through the center of the state; the Allegheny and Pocono mountains span much of Northeastern Pennsylvania; close to 60% of the state is forested. While it has only  of waterfront along Lake Erie and the Delaware River, Pennsylvania has more navigable rivers than any other state in the nation, including the Delaware, Ohio, and Pine Creek rivers.

Pennsylvania was founded in 1681 through a royal land grant to William Penn, son of the state's namesake; a southeast portion of the state was once part of the colony of New Sweden. Established as a haven for religious and political tolerance, the Province of Pennsylvania was known for its relatively peaceful relations with native tribes, innovative government system, and religious pluralism. Pennsylvania was one of thirteen British colonies from which the nation was formed.

Pennsylvania played a vital and historic role in the American Revolution and the ultimately successful quest for independence from the British Empire. Its largest city, Philadelphia, was the gathering place of the nation's Founding Fathers and home to much of the thinking, activism, and writing that inspired the American Revolution. Philadelphia hosted the First Continental Congress in Carpenters' Hall in 1774, and, beginning the following year, the Second Continental Congress in Independence Hall, which in 1776 unanimously adopted the Declaration of Independence, a document that historian Joseph Ellis has described as "the most potent and consequential words in American history" and which formally launched the American Revolutionary War.

On December 25 and 26, 1776, Washington secretly led a column of Continental Army troops across the Delaware River from Bucks County, launching a successful surprise attack against Hessian mercenaries at the Battle of Trenton. In 1777 and 1778, the national capital of Philadelphia fell under British control for nine months, and multiple Revolutionary War battles were fought in Pennsylvania. For six months, Washington and 12,000 Continental Army troops encamped at Valley Forge over a harsh winter with limited supplies; roughly 1,700 to 2,000 of them died at Valley Forge from disease and malnutrition.

In Philadelphia, the Second Continental Congress, on June 21, 1778, ratified the Articles of Confederation, which served as the foundation for the ultimate development and ratification of the U.S. Constitution. On December 12, 1787, Pennsylvania became the second state after Delaware, which had previously been part of Pennsylvania as the three lower counties, to ratify the Constitution. On eight separate occasions prior to the construction of Washington, D.C. as the nation's capital, a Pennsylvania city served as the nation's capital. Philadelphia served as the nation's capital on six separate occasions, including from 1775 to 1776, in 1777, twice in 1778, in 1781, and from 1790 to 1800; York and Lancaster both briefly served as the nation's capital in 1777.

During the American Civil War, Pennsylvania's 360,000 Union Army volunteers proved influential in strengthening the Union, successfully guarding the national capital of Washington, D.C., which was vulnerable following the fall of Fort Sumter, and later leading daring raids against Confederate Army strongholds in the Deep South. The bloodiest battle of the Civil War with over 50,000 casualties, and one of the Union Army's most important victories, was fought on Pennsylvania soil at Gettysburg over three days in July 1863. The Union Army's victory at Gettysburg is considered the turning point in the war, leading to the Union's preservation. President Abraham Lincoln's 271-word address dedicating Gettysburg National Cemetery on November 19, 1863, remains one of the best-known speeches in American history.

In the late 19th and 20th centuries, Pittsburgh-based U.S. Steel, Bethlehem-based Bethlehem Steel, and other Pennsylvania manufacturing companies inspired the American Industrial Revolution and contributed to the development of much of the nation's early infrastructure, including key bridges, skyscrapers, and warships, tanks, and other military hardware used in U.S.-led victories in World War I, World War II, and the Cold War. Since Pennsylvania's 1787 founding, a number of influential Pennsylvanians have contributed significantly to the nation in many fields, including the military, politics, business, scientific innovation, thought leadership, philanthropy, music, art, and sports.

History

Indigenous settlement
Pennsylvania's history of human habitation extends to thousands of years before the foundation of the colonial Province of Pennsylvania in 1681. Archaeologists believe the first settlement of the Americas occurred at least 15,000 years ago during the last glacial period, though it is unclear when humans first entered the area now known as Pennsylvania. There also is open debate in the archaeological community regarding when ancestors of Native Americans expanded across the two continents down to the tip of South America; possibilities range between 30,000 and 10,500 years ago. Meadowcroft Rockshelter in Jefferson Township includes the earliest known signs of human activity in Pennsylvania and perhaps all of North America, including the remains of a civilization that existed over 10,000 years ago and possibly pre-dated the Clovis culture. By 1000 CE, in contrast to their nomadic hunter-gatherer ancestors, the native population of Pennsylvania had developed agricultural techniques and a mixed food economy.

By the time European colonization of the Americas began, at least two major Native American tribes inhabited Pennsylvania. The first, the Lenape, spoke an Algonquian language and inhabited the eastern region of the state, then known as Lenapehoking. It included most of New Jersey and most of the Lehigh Valley and Delaware Valley regions of eastern and southeastern Pennsylvania. The Lenape's territory ended somewhere between the Delaware River in the east and the Susquehanna River in central Pennsylvania. The Susquehannock, who spoke an Iroquoian language, were based in more western regions of Pennsylvania from New York in the north to West Virginia in the southwest that included the Susquehanna River all the way to the Allegheny and Monongahela rivers near present day Pittsburgh. European disease and constant warfare with several neighbors and groups of Europeans weakened these tribes, and they were grossly outpaced financially as the Hurons and Iroquois blocked them from proceeding west into Ohio during the Beaver Wars. As they lost numbers and land, they abandoned much of their western territory and moved closer to the Susquehanna River and the Iroquois and Mohawk tribes located more to the north. Northwest of the Allegheny River was the Iroquoian Petun, known mostly for their vast tobacco plantations, although this is believed to be complete fabrication. They were fragmented into three groups during the Beaver Wars: the Petun of New York, the Wyandot of Ohio, and the Tiontatecaga of the Kanawha River in southern West Virginia. South of the Allegheny River was a nation known as Calicua. They may have been the same as the Monongahela culture and little is known about them except that they were probably a Siouan culture. Archaeological sites from this time in this region are scarce.

17th century

In the 17th century, the Dutch and the English each claimed both sides of the Delaware River as part of their colonial lands in America. The Dutch were the first to take possession. By June 3, 1631, the Dutch began settling the Delmarva Peninsula by establishing the Zwaanendael Colony on the site of present-day Lewes, Delaware. In 1638, Sweden established New Sweden Colony in the region of Fort Christina on the site of present-day Wilmington, Delaware. New Sweden claimed and, for the most part, controlled the lower Delaware River region, including parts of present-day Delaware, New Jersey, and Pennsylvania, but settled few colonists there.

On March 12, 1664, King Charles II of England gave James, Duke of York a grant that incorporated all lands included in the original Virginia Company of Plymouth Grant and other lands. This grant was in conflict with the Dutch claim for New Netherland, which included parts of today's Pennsylvania.

On June 24, 1664, the Duke of York sold the portion of his large grant that included present-day New Jersey to John Berkeley and George Carteret for a proprietary colony. The land was not yet in British possession, but the sale boxed in the portion of New Netherland on the West side of the Delaware River. The British conquest of New Netherland began on August 29, 1664, when New Amsterdam was coerced to surrender while facing cannons on British ships in New York Harbor. This conquest continued, and was completed in October 1664, when the British captured Fort Casimir in what today is New Castle, Delaware.

The Peace of Breda between England, France, and the Netherlands confirmed the English conquest on July 21, 1667, although there were temporary reversions.

On September 12, 1672, during the Third Anglo-Dutch War, the Dutch reconquered New York Colony/New Amsterdam, establishing three County Courts, which went on to become original Counties in present-day Delaware and Pennsylvania. The one that later transferred to Pennsylvania was Upland. This was partially reversed on February 9, 1674, when the Treaty of Westminster ended the Third Anglo-Dutch War and reverted all political situations to the status quo ante bellum. The British retained the Dutch Counties with their Dutch names. By June 11, 1674, New York reasserted control over the outlying colonies, including Upland, and the names started to be changed to British names by November 11, 1674. Upland was partitioned on November 12, 1674, producing the general outline of the current border between Pennsylvania and Delaware.

On February 28, 1681, Charles II granted a land charter to Quaker leader William Penn to repay a debt of £16,000 (around £2,100,000 in 2008, adjusting for retail inflation) owed to William's father. This transaction represents one of the largest land grants to an individual in history. Penn proposed that the land be called New Wales, but there were objections to that name, so he recommended Sylvania (from the Latin silva: "forest, woods"). The King named it Pennsylvania (literally "Penn's Woods") in honor of Admiral Penn. The younger Penn was embarrassed at this name, fearing that people would think he had named it after himself, but King Charles would not rename the grant. Penn established a government with two innovations that were much copied in the New World: the county commission and freedom of religious conviction.

What had been Upland on the Pennsylvania side of the Pennsylvania-Delaware border was renamed as Chester County when Pennsylvania instituted their colonial governments on March 4, 1681. Penn signed a peace treaty with Tamanend, leader of the Lenape, which began a long period of friendly relations between the Quakers and the Indians. Additional treaties between Quakers and other tribes followed. The treaty of William Penn was never violated.

18th century

Between 1730 and when the Pennsylvania Colony was shut down by Parliament with the Currency Act of 1764, the Pennsylvania Colony made its own paper money to account for the shortage of actual gold and silver. The paper money was called Colonial Scrip. The Colony issued bills of credit, which were as good as gold or silver coins because of their legal tender status. Since they were issued by the government and not a banking institution, it was an interest-free proposition, largely defraying the expense of the government and therefore taxation of the people. It also promoted general employment and prosperity, since the government used discretion and did not issue excessive amounts that inflated the currency. Benjamin Franklin had a hand in creating this currency, whose utility, he said, was never to be disputed. The currency also met with "cautious approval" by Adam Smith.

The University of Pennsylvania in Philadelphia was founded by Benjamin Franklin in 1740, becoming one of the nine colonial colleges and the first college established in the state and one of the first in the nation; today, it is an Ivy League university that is ranked one the world's best universities. Dickinson College in Carlisle was the first college founded after the states united. Established in 1773, Dickinson was ratified five days after the Treaty of Paris on September 9, 1783, and was founded by Benjamin Rush and named after John Dickinson.

James Smith wrote that in 1763, "the Indians again commenced hostilities, and were busily engaged in killing and scalping the frontier inhabitants in various parts of Pennsylvania." Further, "This state was then a Quaker government, and at the first of this war the frontiers received no assistance from the state." The ensuing hostilities became known as Pontiac's War.

After the Stamp Act Congress of 1765, Delegate John Dickinson of Philadelphia wrote the Declaration of Rights and Grievances. The Congress was the first meeting of the Thirteen Colonies, called at the request of the Massachusetts Assembly, but only nine colonies sent delegates. Dickinson then wrote Letters from a Farmer in Pennsylvania, To the Inhabitants of the British Colonies, which were published in the Pennsylvania Chronicle between December 2, 1767, and February 15, 1768.

When the Founding Fathers convened in Philadelphia in 1774, 12 colonies sent representatives to the First Continental Congress. The Second Continental Congress, which also met in Philadelphia (in May 1775), authored and signed the Declaration of Independence in Philadelphia, but when Philadelphia was captured by the British in the Philadelphia Campaign, the Continental Congress moved west, meeting at the Lancaster courthouse on Saturday, September 27, 1777, and then to York. In York, they adopted the Articles of Confederation, largely authored by John Dickinson, that formed 13 independent States into a new union. Later, the Constitution was written, and Philadelphia was once again chosen to be cradle to the new nation. The Constitution was drafted and signed at the Pennsylvania State House, now known as Independence Hall, and the same building where the Declaration of Independence was signed in 1776.

Pennsylvania became the second state to ratify the U.S. Constitution on December 12, 1787, five days after Delaware became the first. At the time, Pennsylvania was the most ethnically and religiously diverse of the thirteen colonies. Because a third of Pennsylvania's population spoke German, the Constitution was presented in German so those citizens could participate in the discussion about it. Reverend Frederick Muhlenberg, a Lutheran minister and the first Speaker of the U.S. House of Representatives, acted as chairman of Pennsylvania's ratifying convention.

For half a century, the Pennsylvania General Assembly met at various places in the Philadelphia area before it began meeting regularly in Independence Hall in Philadelphia for 63 years. However, events such as the Paxton Boys massacres of 1763 had made the legislature aware of the need for a central capital. In 1799, the General Assembly moved to the Lancaster Courthouse.

19th century

The General Assembly met in the old Dauphin County Court House until December 1821 when the Federal-style Hills Capitol, named for Lancaster architect Stephen Hills, was constructed on a hilltop land grant of four acres set aside for a seat of state government in Harrisburg by the son and namesake of John Harris, Sr., a Yorkshire native who founded a trading post and ferry on the east shore of the Susquehanna River in 1705. The Hills Capitol burned down on February 2, 1897, during a heavy snowstorm, presumably because of a faulty flue.

The General Assembly met at a nearby Methodist Church until a new capitol could be built. Following an architectural selection contest that some alleged had been rigged, Chicago architect Henry Ives Cobb was asked to design and build a replacement building. However, the legislature had little money to allocate to the project. When  they dubbed the roughly finished somewhat industrial Cobb Capitol building complete, the General Assembly refused to occupy the building. In 1901, political and popular indignation prompted a second contest that was restricted to Pennsylvania architects; Joseph Miller Huston of Philadelphia was chosen to design the present Pennsylvania State Capitol that incorporated Cobb's building into a magnificent public work, finished and dedicated in 1907.

James Buchanan, a Franklin County native, served as the 15th U.S. president and was the first president to be born in Pennsylvania. The Battle of Gettysburg, the major turning point of the American Civil War, took place near Gettysburg in July 1863. An estimated 350,000 Pennsylvanians served in the Union Army forces, including 8,600 African American military volunteers.

The politics of Pennsylvania were for decades dominated by the financially conservative Republican-aligned Cameron machine, established by  U.S. Senator Simon Cameron, later the Secretary of War under President Abraham Lincoln. Control of the machine was subsequently passed on to Cameron's son J. Donald Cameron, whose ineffectiveness resulted in a transfer of power to the more shrewd Matthew Quay and finally to Boies Penrose.

The post-Civil War era, known as the Gilded Age, saw the continued rise of industry in Pennsylvania. Pennsylvania was home to some of the largest steel companies in the world. Andrew Carnegie founded the Carnegie Steel Company in Pittsburgh and Charles M. Schwab founded Bethlehem Steel in Bethlehem. Other titans of industry, including John D. Rockefeller and Jay Gould, also operated in Pennsylvania. In the latter half of the 19th century, the U.S. oil industry was born in Western Pennsylvania, which supplied the vast majority of kerosene for years thereafter. As the Pennsylvania oil rush developed, Pennsylvania's oil boom towns, such as Titusville, rose and later fell. Coal mining, primarily in the state's Coal Region in the northeast region of the state, also was a major industry for much of the 19th and 20th centuries. In 1903, Milton S. Hershey began construction on a chocolate factory in Hershey, Pennsylvania; The Hershey Company grew to become the largest chocolate manufacturer in North America. Heinz Company was also founded during this period. These huge companies exercised a large influence on the politics of Pennsylvania; as Henry Demarest Lloyd put it, oil baron John D. Rockefeller "had done everything with the Pennsylvania legislature except refine it". Pennsylvania created a Department of Highways and engaged in a vast program of road-building, while railroads continued to see heavy usage.

The growth of industry eventually provided middle class incomes to working-class households after the development of labor unions helped them gain living wages. However, the rise of unions also led to a rise of union busting with several private police forces springing up. Pennsylvania was the location of the first documented organized strike in North America, and Pennsylvania was the location of two hugely prominent strikes, the Great Railroad Strike of 1877 and the Coal Strike of 1902. The eight-hour day was eventually adopted, and the coal and iron police were banned.

20th century

At the beginning of the 20th century, Pennsylvania's economy centered on steel production, logging, coal mining, textile production, and other forms of industrial manufacturing. A surge in immigration to the U.S. during the late 19th and early 20th centuries provided a steady flow of cheap labor for these industries, which often employed children and people who could not speak English from Southern and Eastern Europe. Thousands of Pennsylvanians volunteered during the Spanish–American War. Pennsylvania was an important industrial center in World War I, and the state provided over 300,000 soldiers for the military. On May 31, 1918, the Pittsburgh Agreement was signed in Pittsburgh to declare the formation of the independent state of Czechoslovakia with future Czechoslovak president Tomáš Masaryk.

In 1923, President Calvin Collidge established the Allegheny National Forest under the authority of the Weeks Act of 1911. The forest is located in the northwest part of the state in Elk, Forest, McKean, and Warren Counties for the purposes of timber production and watershed protection in the Allegheny River basin. The Allegheny is the state's only national forest.

Pennsylvania manufactured 6.6 percent of total U.S. military armaments produced during World War II, ranking sixth among the 48 states. The Philadelphia Naval Shipyard served as an important naval base, and Pennsylvania produced important military leaders, including George C. Marshall, Hap Arnold, Jacob Devers, and Carl Spaatz. During the war, over a million Pennsylvanians served in the armed forces, and more Medals of Honor were awarded to Pennsylvanians than to individuals from any other state.

The Three Mile Island accident was the most significant nuclear accident in U.S. commercial nuclear power plant history. The state was hard-hit by the decline and restructuring of the steel industry and other heavy industries during the late 20th century. With job losses came heavy population losses, especially in the state's largest cities. Pittsburgh lost its place among the top ten most populous cities in the United States by 1950, and Philadelphia dropped to the fifth and later sixth largest city after decades of being among the top three.

After 1990, as information-based industries became more important in the economy, state and local governments put more resources into the old, well-established public library system. Some localities, however, used new state funding to cut local taxes. New ethnic groups, especially Hispanics and Latinos, began entering the state to fill low-skill jobs in agriculture and service industries. For example, in Chester County, Mexican immigrants brought the Spanish language, increased Catholicism, high birth rates, and cuisine when they were hired as agricultural laborers; in some rural localities, they made up half or more of the population. Meanwhile, Stateside Puerto Ricans built a large community in the state's third largest city, Allentown. They comprised over 40% of the city's population by 2000.

In the 20th century, as Pennsylvania's historical national and even global leadership in mining largely ceased and its steelmaking and other heavy manufacturing sectors slowed, the state sought to grow its service and other industries to replace the jobs and economic productivity lost from the downturn of these industries. Pittsburgh's concentration of universities has enabled it to be a leader in technology and healthcare. Similarly, Philadelphia has a concentration of university expertise. Healthcare, retail, transportation, and tourism are some of the state's growing industries of the postindustrial era. As in the rest of the nation, most residential population growth has occurred in suburban rather than central city areas, although both major cities have had significant revitalization in their downtown areas. Philadelphia anchors the seventh-largest metropolitan area in the country, while Pittsburgh is the center of the twenty-seventh largest metro area in the country. The growth of the Lehigh Valley has made it one of the seventy most populous metro areas in the country, while Pennsylvania also has six other metro areas among the top 200 most populous American metro areas. Philadelphia forms part of the Northeast megalopolis and is associated with the Northeastern United States, while Pittsburgh is part of the Great Lakes megalopolis and is often associated with the Midwestern United States and the Rust Belt.

21st century

The hijackers had intended to crash the plane into either the United States Capitol or The White House. After learning from family members via air phone of the earlier attacks on the World Trade Center, however, Flight 93 passengers on board revolted against the hijackers and fought for control of the plane, causing it to crash. It was the only one of the four aircraft hijacked that day that never reached its intended target and the heroism of the passengers has been commemorated.

Beginning in 2003, the Tekko anime convention is held annually in Pittsburgh. In October 2018, the Tree of Life – Or L'Simcha Congregation experienced the Pittsburgh synagogue shooting.

Geography

It is the 33rd-largest state in the United States. Of the original Thirteen Colonies, Pennsylvania is the only state that does not border the Atlantic Ocean.

The boundaries of the state are the Mason–Dixon line (39°43' N) to the south, Twelve-Mile Circle on the Pennsylvania-Delaware border, the Delaware River to the east, 80°31' W to the west, and the 42° N to the north, except for a short segment on the western end where a triangle extends north to Lake Erie. The state has five geographical regions: Allegheny Plateau, Ridge and Valley, Atlantic Coastal Plain, Piedmont, and Erie Plain.

Climate

Pennsylvania's diverse topography produces a variety of climates, though the entire state experiences cold winters and humid summers. Straddling two major zones, the majority of the state, except for the southeastern corner, has a humid continental climate (Köppen climate classification Dfb). The southern portion of the state has a humid subtropical climate. The largest city, Philadelphia, has a humid subtropical climate (Köppen Cfa).

Summers are generally hot and humid. Moving toward the mountainous interior of the state, the winter climate becomes colder, the number of cloudy days increases, and snowfall amounts are greater. The state may be subject to severe weather from spring through summer into autumn. Tornadoes occur annually in the state, sometimes in large numbers, such as 30 recorded tornadoes in 2011; generally speaking, these tornadoes do not cause significant damage.

Municipalities

Cities in Pennsylvania include Philadelphia, Reading, Lebanon and Lancaster in the southeast, Pittsburgh in the southwest, and the tri-cities of Allentown, Bethlehem, and Easton in the central east, known as the Lehigh Valley. The northeast includes the former anthracite coal mining cities of Scranton, Wilkes-Barre, Pittston, Nanticoke, and Hazleton. Erie is located in the northwest. State College is located in the central region. Williamsport is in the north-central region with York, Carlisle, and the state capital Harrisburg on the Susquehanna River in the east-central region of the state. Altoona and Johnstown are in the state's west-central region.

The state's three most populated cities, in order of size, are Philadelphia, Pittsburgh, and Allentown.

Adjacent states and province
 Ontario (Province of Canada) (Northwest)
 New York (North and Northeast)
 New Jersey (East and Southeast)
 Delaware (Extreme Southeast)
 Maryland (South)
 West Virginia (Southwest)
 Ohio (West)

Demographics

As of the 2020 U.S. census, Pennsylvania had a population of 13,011,844, up from 12,702,379 in 2010. In 2019, net migration to other states resulted in a decrease of 27,718, and immigration from other countries resulted in an increase of 127,007. Net migration to the Commonwealth was 98,289. Migration of native Pennsylvanians resulted in a decrease of 100,000 people. From 2008 to 2012, 5.8% of the population was foreign-born. Pennsylvania is the fifth most populated state in the U.S. after California, Florida, New York, and Texas.

According to HUD's 2022 Annual Homeless Assessment Report, there were an estimated 12,691 homeless people in Pennsylvania.

Place of origin
Among Pennsylvania residents, as of 2020, 74.5% were born in Pennsylvania, 18.4% were born in a different U.S. state, 1.5% were born in Puerto Rico, U.S. Island areas, or born abroad to American parent(s), and 5.6% were foreign born. Foreign-born Pennsylvanians are largely from Asia (36.0%), Europe (35.9%), and Latin America (30.6%) with the remainder from Africa (5%), North America (3.1%), and Oceania (0.4%).
The state's largest ancestry groups, expressed as a percentage of total people who responded with a particular ancestry for the 2010 census, are:
 German 28.5%
 Irish 18.2%
 Italian 12.8%
 African Americans 9.6%
 English 8.5%
 Polish 7.2%
 French 4.2%

Race and ethnicity
Pennsylvania's Hispanic or Latino American population grew by 82.6% between 2000 and 2010, marking one of the largest increases in a state's Hispanic population. The significant growth of the Hispanic or Latino population is due to migration to the state mainly from Puerto Rico, a U.S. territory, and to a lesser extent immigration from countries such as the Dominican Republic, Mexico, and various Central and South American nations and a wave of Hispanic and Latinos leaving New York and New Jersey for safer and more affordable living. The Asian population swelled by almost 60%, fueled by Indian, Vietnamese, and Chinese immigration, and many Asian transplants moving to Philadelphia from New York. The rapid growth of this community has given Pennsylvania one of the largest Asian populations in the nation. The African American population grew by 13%, which was the largest increase in that population among the state's peers (New York, New Jersey, Ohio, Illinois, and Michigan). Pennsylvania has a high in-migration of black and Hispanic people from other nearby states with the eastern and south-central portions of the state seeing the bulk of the increases.

The majority of Hispanic or Latino Americans in Pennsylvania are of Puerto Rican descent. Most of the remaining Hispanic or Latino population is made up of Mexicans and Dominicans. Most Hispanic or Latinos are concentrated in Philadelphia, Lehigh Valley, and South Central Pennsylvania. The Hispanic or Latino population is greatest in Bethlehem, Allentown, Reading, Lancaster, York, and around Philadelphia. It is not clear how much of this change reflects a changing population and how much reflects increased willingness to self-identify minority status. As of 2010, it is estimated that about 85% of all Hispanics or Latino Americans in Pennsylvania live within a  radius of Philadelphia, with about 20% living within the city itself.

Among the state's black population, the vast majority in the state are African American. There are also a growing number of black residents of West Indian, recent African, and Hispanic or Latino origins. Most black people live in the Philadelphia area, Pittsburgh, and South Central Pennsylvania. Non-Hispanic whites make up the majority of Pennsylvania; they are mostly descended from German, Irish, Scottish, Welsh, Italian, and English immigrants. Rural portions of South Central Pennsylvania are recognized nationally for their notable Amish communities. Wyoming Valley, including Scranton and Wilkes-Barre, has the highest percentage of white residents of any metropolitan area with a population of 500,000 or above in the U.S.; in Wyoming Valley, 96.2% of the population claim to be white with no Hispanic background. Pennsylvania's center of population is in Duncannon in Perry County.

Birth data
Note: Births in table do not add up because Hispanics are counted both by their ethnicity and by their race, giving a higher overall number.

 Since 2016, data for births of White Hispanic origin have not been collected, but included in one Hispanic group; persons of Hispanic origin may be of any race.

Age and poverty
As of the 2010 census, Pennsylvania had the fourth-highest proportion of elderly (65+) citizens in the nation at 15.4%, compared to a national average of 13.0%. According to U.S. Census Bureau estimates, the state's poverty rate was 12.5% in 2017 compared to 13.4% for the U.S. as a whole.

Languages

As of 2010, 90.2% (10,710,239) of Pennsylvania residents age five and older spoke English at home as a primary language while 4.1% (486,058) spoke Spanish, 0.9% (103,502) spoke German including Pennsylvania Dutch, and 0.5% (56,052) spoke Chinese, which includes Mandarin of the population over the age of five. In total, 9.9% (1,170,628) of Pennsylvania's population age5 and older spoke a mother tongue other than English.

Pennsylvania Dutch language

Pennsylvania German, spoken by nearly one percent of Pennsylvania's population as of 2010, is often misleadingly called Pennsylvania Dutch. The term Dutch was used to mean German, including the Netherlands, before the Latin name for them replaced it. When referring to the language spoken by the Pennsylvania Dutch people, Pennsylvania German, it means German". In fact, Germans, in their own language, call themselves Deutsch, (Pennsylvania German: "Deitsch"). Pennsylvania Dutch is a descendant of German in the West Central German dialect family and is closest to Palatine German. Pennsylvania German is still very vigorous as a first language among Old Order Amish and Old Order Mennonites, principally in the Lancaster County and Berks County areas; it is almost extinct as an everyday language outside the plain communities, though a few words have passed into English usage.

Religion

Of the original Thirteen Colonies, Pennsylvania and Rhode Island had the most religious freedom. Voltaire, writing of William Penn in 1733, observed: "The new sovereign also enacted several wise and wholesome laws for his colony, which have remained invariably the same to this day. The chief is, to ill-treat no person on account of religion, and to consider as brethren all those who believe in one God." One result of this uncommon freedom was a wide religious diversity, which continues to the present.

Pennsylvania's population in 2010 was 12,702,379; of these, 6,838,440 (53.8%) were estimated to belong to some sort of organized religion. According to the Association of Religion Data Archives (ARDA) at Pennsylvania State University, the largest religious bodies in Pennsylvania by adherents were the Roman Catholic Church with 3,503,028 adherents, the United Methodist Church with 591,734 members, and the Evangelical Lutheran Church in America with 501,974 members. Since 2014, among the state's religious population, 73% were Christian, according to Pew Research Center. In 2020, the Public Religion Research Institute estimated 68% of the population identified with Christianity. As of 2014, 47% of all Pennsylvanians identified as Protestants, making Protestantism far and away the most prominent religious affiliation among Pennsylvanians. Among all self-identified Christians in the state, however, 24% identified as Catholics, the most of any Christian religious affiliation.

Pennsylvania, especially in the Greater Pittsburgh area, has one of the largest communities of Presbyterians in the nation, the third highest by percentage of population and the largest outright in membership as Protestant Christians. The American Presbyterian Church, with about 250,000 members and 1,011 congregations, is the largest Presbyterian denomination while the Presbyterian Church in America is also significant, with 112 congregations and approximately 23,000 adherents; the EPC has around 50 congregations, including the ECO, according to 2010 estimates. The fourth-largest Protestant denomination, the United Church of Christ, has 180,000 members and 627 congregations in the state. The American Baptist Churches, also referred to as the Northern Baptist Convention is based in King of Prussia.

Pennsylvania was the center state of the German Reformed denomination from the 1700s. Bethlehem is one of the headquarters of the Moravian Church in the U.S. Pennsylvania also has a very large Amish population, second only to Ohio among U.S. states. As of 2000, there was a total Amish population of 47,860 in Pennsylvania and an additional 146,416 Mennonites and 91,200 Brethren. The total Anabapist population including Bruderhof was 232,631, about two percent of the population. While Pennsylvania owes its existence to Quakers, and much of the historic character of the Commonwealth is ideologically rooted in the teachings of the Religious Society of Friends (as they are officially known), practicing Quakers are a small minority of about 10,000 adherents as of 2010.

Economy

As of 2021, Pennsylvania's gross state product (GSP) of $839.4 billion ranks 6th among all U.S. states, behind California, Texas, New York, Florida, and Illinois. As of 2021, if Pennsylvania were an independent country, its economy would rank as the 22nd largest in the world. On a per capita basis, Pennsylvania's 2021 per capita GSP of $64,751 ranks 24th among the fifty states. As of 2016, there were 5,354,964 people in employment in Pennsylvania with 301,484 total employer establishments. As of May 2020, the state's unemployment rate is 13.1%.

Philadelphia in the southeast corner, Pittsburgh in the southwest corner, Erie in the northwest corner, Scranton-Wilkes-Barre in the northeast corner, and the Lehigh Valley in the east central region are urban manufacturing centers. Much of Pennsylvania is rural; this dichotomy affects state politics and the state economy. Philadelphia is home to six Fortune 500 companies, with more located in suburbs like King of Prussia; it is a leader in the financial and insurance industries.

Pittsburgh is home to eight Fortune 500 companies, including U.S. Steel, PPG Industries, and H.J. Heinz. In all, Pennsylvania is home to 50 Fortune 500 companies. Hershey is home to The Hershey Company, one of the largest chocolate manufacturers in the world. Erie is home to GE Transportation, the nation's largest manufacturer of train locomotives. In eastern Pennsylvania, the Lehigh Valley has become an epicenter for the growth of the U.S. logistics industry, including warehousing and the intermodal transport of goods.

Like many U.S. states, Walmart is the largest private employer in Pennsylvania followed by the University of Pennsylvania, an Ivy League private research university in Philadelphia. Pennsylvania is home to the oldest investor-owned utility company in the U.S., The York Water Company.

Banking
The first nationally chartered bank in the U.S., the Bank of North America, was founded in 1781 in Philadelphia. After a series of mergers, the Bank of North America is now part of Wells Fargo. Pennsylvania is home to the first nationally-chartered bank under the 1863 National Banking Act. That year, the Pittsburgh Savings & Trust Company received a national charter and renamed itself the First National Bank of Pittsburgh as part of the National Banking Act. That bank is still in existence today as PNC and remains based in Pittsburgh. PNC is currently the state's largest bank and the nation's sixth largest bank.

Agriculture

Pennsylvania ranks 19th overall among all states in agricultural production. Its leading agricultural products are mushrooms, apples, Christmas trees, layer chickens, nursery, sod, milk, corn for silage, grapes (including juice grapes), and horses production. Pennsylvania ranks eighth in the nation in winemaking.

The Pennsylvania Department of Agriculture worked with private companies to establish "PA Preferred" as a way to brand agricultural products grown or made in the state. The financial impact of agriculture in Pennsylvania includes employment of more than 66,800 people employed by the food manufacturing industry and over $1.7 billion in food product export as of 2011.

Gambling

Casino gambling was legalized in Pennsylvania in 2004. As of 2022, there are 16 casinos in the state. Table games such as poker, roulette, blackjack, and craps were approved by the state legislature and signed into law in January 2010.

Film

The Pennsylvania Film Production Tax Credit began in 2004 and stimulated the development of a film industry in the state.

Governance

Pennsylvania has had five constitutions during its statehood: 1776, 1790, 1838, 1874, and 1968. Before that the province of Pennsylvania was governed for a century by a Frame of Government, of which there were four versions: 1682, 1683, 1696, and 1701. The capital of Pennsylvania is Harrisburg. The legislature meets there in the State Capitol.

In a 2020 study, Pennsylvania was ranked as the 19th hardest state for citizens to vote in.

Executive

The current Governor is Josh Shapiro. The other elected officials composing the executive branch are the Lieutenant Governor Austin Davis, Acting Attorney General Michelle Henry, Auditor General Timothy DeFoor, and Pennsylvania Treasurer Stacy Garrity. The Governor and Lieutenant Governor run as a ticket in the general election and are up for re-election every four years during the midterm elections. The elections for Attorney General, Auditor General, and Treasurer are held every four years coinciding with a Presidential election.

Legislative

Pennsylvania has a bicameral legislature set up by Commonwealth's constitution in 1790. The original Frame of Government of William Penn had a unicameral legislature. The General Assembly includes 50 Senators and 203 Representatives. Joe Scarnati is currently President Pro Tempore of the State Senate, Jake Corman the Majority Leader, and Jay Costa the Minority Leader. Bryan Cutler is Speaker of the House of Representatives, with Kerry A. Benninghoff as Majority Leader and Frank Dermody as Minority Leader. As of the 2018 elections, the Republicans hold the majority in the State House and Senate.

Judiciary

Pennsylvania is divided into 60 judicial districts, most of which (except Philadelphia) have magisterial district judges (formerly called district justices and justices of the peace), who preside mainly over preliminary hearings in felony and misdemeanor offenses, all minor (summary) criminal offenses, and small civil claims. Most criminal and civil cases originate in the Courts of Common Pleas, which also serve as appellate courts to the district judges and for local agency decisions. The Superior Court hears all appeals from the Courts of Common Pleas not expressly designated to the Commonwealth Court or Supreme Court. It also has original jurisdiction to review warrants for wiretap surveillance. The Commonwealth Court is limited to appeals from final orders of certain state agencies and certain designated cases from the Courts of Common Pleas. The Supreme Court of Pennsylvania is the final appellate court. All judges in Pennsylvania are elected; the chief justice is determined by seniority.

Local government

Pennsylvania is divided into 67 counties. Counties are further subdivided into municipalities that are either incorporated as cities, boroughs, or townships. One county, Philadelphia County, is coterminous with the city of Philadelphia after it was consolidated in 1854. The most populous county in Pennsylvania is Philadelphia, while the least populous is Cameron (4,547).

There are a total of 56 cities in Pennsylvania, which are classified, by population, as either first-, second-, or third-class cities. Philadelphia, Pennsylvania's largest city, has a population of 1.6 million and is the state's only first-class city. Pittsburgh (303,000) and Scranton (76,000) are second-class and second-class 'A' cities, respectively. The rest of the cities, like the third and fourth-largest—Allentown (126,000) and Reading (95,000)—to the smallest—Parker with a population of only 820—are third-class cities. First- and second-class cities are governed by a "strong mayor" form of mayor–council government, whereas third-class cities are governed by either a "weak mayor" form of government or a council–manager government.

Boroughs are generally smaller than cities, with most Pennsylvania cities having been incorporated as a borough before being incorporated as a city. There are 958 boroughs in Pennsylvania, all of which are governed by the "weak mayor" form of mayor-council government. The largest borough in Pennsylvania is State College (40,501) and the smallest is Centralia.

Townships are the third type of municipality in Pennsylvania and are classified as either first-class or second-class townships. There are 1,454 second-class townships and 93 first-class townships. Pennsylvania's largest township is Upper Darby Township (85,681), and the smallest is East Keating Township.

There is one exception to the types of municipalities in Pennsylvania: Bloomsburg was incorporated as a town in 1870 and is, officially, the only town in the state. In 1975, McCandless Township adopted a home-rule charter under the name of "Town of McCandless", but is, legally, still a first-class township. The state has 56 cities, 958 boroughs, 93 first-class townships, 1,454 second-class townships, and one town (Bloomsburg) for a total of 2,562 municipalities.

Taxation
Pennsylvania had the 15th-highest state and local tax burden in the nation as of 2012, according to the Tax Foundation. Residents paid a total of $83.7 billion in state and local taxes with a per capita average of $4,589 annually. Residents share 76% of the total tax burden. Many state politicians have tried to increase the share of taxes paid by out-of-state sources. Suggested revenue sources include taxing natural gas drilling as Pennsylvania is the only state without such a tax on gas drilling. Additional revenue prospects include trying to place tolls on interstate highways; specifically Interstate 80, which is used heavily by out of state commuters with high maintenance costs.

Sales taxes provide 39% of the Commonwealth's revenue; personal income taxes 34%; motor vehicle taxes about 12%, and taxes on cigarettes and alcoholic beverages 5%. The personal income tax is a flat 3.07%. An individual's taxable income is based on the following eight types of income: compensation (salary); interest; dividends; net profits from the operation of a business, profession or farm; net gains or income from the dispositions of property; net gains or income from rents, royalties, patents and copyrights; income derived through estates or trusts; and gambling and lottery winnings (other than Pennsylvania Lottery winnings).

Counties, municipalities, and school districts levy taxes on real estate. In addition, some local bodies assess a wage tax on personal income. Generally, the total wage tax rate is capped at 1% of income but some municipalities with home rule charters may charge more than 1%. Thirty-two of the Commonwealth's sixty-seven counties levy a personal property tax on stocks, bonds, and similar holdings. With the exception of the city of Philadelphia, Pennsylvania, municipalities and school districts are allowed to enact a local earned income tax within the purview of Act 32. Residents of these municipalities and school districts are required to file a local income tax return in addition to federal and state returns. This local return is filed with the local income tax collector, a private collection agency appointed by a particular county to collect the local earned income and local services tax (the latter a flat fee deducted from salaried employees working within a particular municipality or school district).

Philadelphia has its own local income taxation system. Philadelphia-based employers are required to withhold the Philadelphia wage tax from the salaries of their employees. Residents of Philadelphia working for an employer are not required to file a local return as long as their Philadelphia wage tax is fully withheld by their employer. If their employer does not withhold the Philadelphia wage tax, residents are required to register with the Revenue Department and file an Earnings Tax return. Residents of Philadelphia with self-employment income are required to file a Net Profits Tax (NPT) return, while those with business income from Philadelphia sources are required to obtain a Commercial Activity License (CAL) and pay the Business Income and Receipts Tax (BIRT) and the NPT. Residents with unearned income (except for interest from checking and savings accounts) are required to file and pay the School Income-tax (SIT).

The complexity of Pennsylvania's local tax filing system has been criticized by experts, who note that the outsourcing of collections to private entities is akin to tax farming and that many new residents are caught off guard and end up facing failure to file penalties even if they did not owe any tax. Attempts to transfer local income tax collections to the state level (i.e. by having a separate local section on the state income tax return, currently the method used to collect local income taxes in New York, Maryland, Indiana, and Iowa) have been unsuccessful.

State law enforcement

The Pennsylvania State Police is the chief law enforcement agency in the Commonwealth of Pennsylvania.

Politics

Since the latter half of the 20th century, Pennsylvania has been perceived as a powerful swing state, and winning Pennsylvania has since been deemed as essential to U.S. presidential candidates. Only twice between 1932 to 1988 (1932 and 1968 with Herbert Hoover and Hubert Humphrey, respectively) has a winning presidential candidate failed to carry Pennsylvania.

Between 1992 and 2016, Pennsylvania trended Democratic in presidential elections; Bill Clinton won the state twice by large margins and Al Gore won it by a slightly closer margin in 2000. In the 2004 presidential election, John F. Kerry beat President George W. Bush in Pennsylvania, 2,938,095 (51%) to 2,793,847 (48%). In the 2008 presidential election, Democrat Barack Obama defeated Republican John McCain in Pennsylvania, 3,276,363 (54%) to 2,655,885 (44%).

In the 2016 presidential election, however, Republican Donald Trump broke the Democratic streak in the state, winning by 2,970,733 (48%) votes to 2,926,441 (47%) votes. The state returned to the Democratic column in 2020 by voting for Joe Biden over Trump, 3,458,229 (50%) to 3,377,674 (49%). The state holds 19 electoral votes.

In recent national elections since 1992, Pennsylvania had leaned Democrat. The state voted for the Democratic ticket for president in every election between 1992 and 2012. During the 2008 election campaign, a recruitment drive saw registered Democrats outnumber registered Republicans by 1.2 million. However, Pennsylvania has a history of electing Republican U.S. Senators. From 2009 to 2011, the state was represented by two Democratic senators for the first time since 1947 after Republican Senator Arlen Specter switched party affiliation. In 2010, Republicans recaptured a U.S. Senate seat and a majority of the state's congressional seats, control of both chambers of the state legislature, and the governorship. Democrats won back the governorship, however, four years later in the 2014 election. It was the first time since a governor became eligible for reelection that an incumbent governor had been defeated in a reelection bid.

Historically, Democratic strength was concentrated in Philadelphia in the southeast, the Pittsburgh and Johnstown areas in the southwest, and Scranton/Wilkes-Barre in the northeast. Republican strength was concentrated in the Philadelphia suburbs and the more rural areas in the state's central, northeastern, and western portions, some of which have long been considered among the nation's most conservative areas. Since 1992, however, the Philadelphia suburbs have swung Democratic; the brand of Republicanism there was traditionally a moderate one. In the 21st century, however, Pittsburgh suburbs, which historically had been Democrat strongholds, have swung more Republican.

Democratic political consultant James Carville once pejoratively described Pennsylvania as "Philadelphia in the east, Pittsburgh in the west, and Alabama in the middle", suggesting that political power in the state was based in its two largest cities, which have been reliably Democrat, offset by the state's large rural power base, which has proven equally reliably Republican. Political analysts and editorials refer to central Pennsylvania as the "T" in statewide elections. The state's three valleys (Delaware, Lehigh, and Wyoming Valleys) and Greater Pittsburgh generally vote Democrat, while the majority of the counties in the central part of the state vote Republican. As a result, maps showing the results of statewide elections invariably form a shape that resembles a "T".

Federal representation

Pennsylvania's two U.S. Senators are Bob Casey Jr. and John Fetterman, both of whom are Democrats. Casey would seek reelection in 2024 should he seek another term. Fetterman was elected in 2022 to succeed retiring Republican Pat Toomey.

Pennsylvania has 17 seats in the U.S. House of Representatives as of 2023.

Education

Pennsylvania has 500 public school districts, thousands of private schools, publicly funded colleges and universities, and over 100 private institutions of higher education.

Primary and secondary education

Under state law, school attendance in Pennsylvania is mandatory for a child from the age of 8until the age of 17, or until graduation from an accredited high school (whichever is earlier) unless students are homeschooled. As of 2005, 83.8% of Pennsylvania residents age 18 to 24 are high school graduates; Among residents age 25 and over, 86.7% have graduated from high school.

The following are the four-year graduation rates for students completing high school in 2016:

Additionally, 27.5% of high school graduates in the state went on to obtain a bachelor's degree or higher, as of 2009. State students consistently do well in standardized testing. In 2007, Pennsylvania ranked 14th in mathematics, 12th in reading, and 10th in writing for 8th grade students. In 1988, the Pennsylvania General Assembly passed Act 169, which allows parents or guardians to homeschool their children as an option for compulsory school attendance. This law specifies the requirements and responsibilities of the parents and the school district where the family lives.

Higher education

The Pennsylvania State System of Higher Education (PASSHE) is the public university system of the Commonwealth, with 14 state-owned schools. West Chester University has by far the largest student body of the 14 universities. The Commonwealth System of Higher Education is an organizing body of the four state-related schools in Pennsylvania; these schools (Pennsylvania State University, Lincoln University, the University of Pittsburgh, and Temple University) are independent institutions that receive some state funding. There are also 15 publicly funded two-year community colleges and technical schools that are separate from the PASSHE system. Additionally, there are many private two- and four-year technical schools, colleges, and universities.

Carnegie Mellon University, Pennsylvania State University, the University of Pennsylvania, and the University of Pittsburgh are members of the Association of American Universities, an invitation-only organization of leading research universities. Lehigh University is a private research university located in Bethlehem. The Pennsylvania State University is the Commonwealth's land-grant university, Sea Grant College and, Space Grant College. The University of Pennsylvania, located in Philadelphia, is considered the first university in the United States and established the country's first medical school. The University of Pennsylvania is also the Commonwealth's only, and geographically most southern, Ivy League school. The Lake Erie College of Osteopathic Medicine (LECOM) is a private graduate school of medicine, dentistry, and pharmacy with a main campus in Erie, and a branch campus located in Greensburg (with two other campuses outside of Pennsylvania). With over 2,200 enrolled medical students, the College of Osteopathic Medicine at LECOM is the largest medical school in the United States. The Pennsylvania Academy of the Fine Arts is the first and oldest art school in the United States. Philadelphia College of Pharmacy, now a part of University of the Sciences in Philadelphia, was the first pharmacy school in the United States.

Recreation

Pennsylvania is home to the nation's first zoo, the Philadelphia Zoo. Other long-accredited AZA zoos include the Erie Zoo and the Pittsburgh Zoo & PPG Aquarium. The Lehigh Valley Zoo and ZooAmerica are other notable zoos. The Commonwealth boasts some of the finest museums in the country, including the Allentown Art Museum in Allentown, Carnegie Museums in Pittsburgh, the Philadelphia Museum of Art, and several others. One unique museum is the Houdini Museum in Scranton, the only building in the world devoted to the legendary magician. Pennsylvania is also home to the National Aviary, located in Pittsburgh.

All 121 state parks in Pennsylvania feature free admission.

Pennsylvania's notable amusement parks include Conneaut Lake Park, Dorney Park & Wildwater Kingdom, Dutch Wonderland, DelGrosso's Amusement Park, Great Wolf Lodge, Hersheypark, Idlewild Park, Kalahari Resorts Poconos, Kennywood, Knoebels, Lakemont Park, Sandcastle Waterpark, Sesame Place, and Waldameer Park. Pennsylvania also is home to the largest indoor waterpark resort on the East Coast, Splash Lagoon in Erie.

The state's notable music festivals include Musikfest, the nation's largest free music festival held annually each August in Bethlehem, the Philadelphia Folk Festival, Creation Festival, and Purple Door. The Great Allentown Fair, held annually at the Allentown Fairgrounds since the 19th century, is one of the nation's longest-running annual fairs.

There are nearly one million licensed hunters in Pennsylvania. Whitetail deer, black bear, cottontail rabbits, squirrel, turkey, and grouse are common game species. Pennsylvania is considered one of the finest wild turkey hunting states in the Union, alongside Texas and Alabama. Sport hunting in Pennsylvania provides a massive boost for the Commonwealth's economy. A report from The Center for Rural Pennsylvania (a Legislative Agency of the Pennsylvania General Assembly) reported that hunting, fishing, and furtaking generated a total of $9.6 billion statewide.

The Boone and Crockett Club reports that five of the ten largest (skull size) black bear entries came from the state. The largest bear ever found dead was in Utah in 1975, and the second-largest was shot by a poacher in the state in 1987. As of 2007, Pennsylvania has the second highest number of Boone and Crockett-recorded record black bears at 183, behind Wisconsin's 299.

Transportation
The Pennsylvania Department of Transportation, abbreviated as PennDOT, is responsible for transport issues within the commonwealth.

Air

Pennsylvania has seven major airports: Philadelphia International, Pittsburgh International, Lehigh Valley International, Harrisburg International, Wilkes-Barre/Scranton International, Erie International, and University Park Airport. A total of 134 public-use airports are located in the state.

Bus and coach
Intercity bus service is provided between cities in Pennsylvania and other major points in the Northeast by Bolt Bus, Fullington Trailways, Greyhound Lines, Martz Trailways, Megabus, OurBus, Trans-Bridge Lines, and various Chinatown bus companies. In 2018, OurBus began offering service from West Chester, Malvern, King of Prussia, and Fort Washington to New York City.

Rail

The Southeastern Pennsylvania Transportation Authority (SEPTA) is the sixth-largest transit agency in the United States and operates the commuter, heavy and light rail transit, and transit bus service in the Philadelphia metropolitan area. Pittsburgh Regional Transit is the 25th-largest transit agency and provides transit bus and light rail service in and around Pittsburgh.

Intercity passenger rail transit is provided by Amtrak, with the majority of traffic occurring on the Keystone Service in the high-speed Keystone Corridor between Harrisburg and Philadelphia's 30th Street Station before heading north to New York City, as well as the Northeast Regional providing frequent high-speed service up and down the Northeast Corridor. The Pennsylvanian follows the same route from New York City to Harrisburg, but extends out to Pittsburgh. The Capitol Limited also passes through Pittsburgh, as well as Connellsville, on its way from Chicago to Washington, D.C. Traveling between Chicago and New York City, the Lake Shore Limited passes through Erie once in each direction. There are 67 short-line, freight railroads operating in Pennsylvania, the highest number in any U.S. state. With more than four million inter-city rail passengers in 2018, Philadelphia's 30th Street Station is Amtrak's third busiest train station in the nation after Penn Station in Manhattan and Union Station in Washington, D.C. and North America's 12th-busiest train station overall.

Road

It is overseen by the Pennsylvania Turnpike Commission. Another major east–west route is Interstate 80, which runs primarily in the northern tier of the state from Ohio to New Jersey at the Delaware Water Gap. Interstate 90 travels the relatively short distance between Ohio and New York through Erie County, in the extreme northwestern part of the state.

All but  of I-476 is the Northeast Extension of the Pennsylvania Turnpike. The highway south of the Pennsylvania Turnpike is officially called the "Veterans Memorial Highway", but is commonly referred to colloquially as the "Blue Route".

Water

The Port of Pittsburgh is the second-largest inland port in the United States and the 18th-largest port overall; the Port of Philadelphia is the 24th-largest port in the United States. Pennsylvania's only port on the Great Lakes is located in Erie. The Allegheny River Lock and Dam Two is the most-used lock operated by the United States Army Corps of Engineers of its 255 nationwide. The dam impounds the Allegheny River near Downtown Pittsburgh.

Culture

Sports

Professional sports

Pennsylvania is home to eight major league professional sports teams: the Philadelphia Phillies and Pittsburgh Pirates of Major League Baseball, the Philadelphia 76ers of the NBA, the Philadelphia Eagles and Pittsburgh Steelers of the NFL, the Philadelphia Flyers and Pittsburgh Penguins of the NHL, and the Philadelphia Union of Major League Soccer. Among them, these teams have accumulated sevenWorld Series championships (with the Pirates winning five and Phillies winning two), 16 National League pennants (with the Pirates winning nine and Phillies winning seven), three pre-Super Bowl era NFL championships (all won by the Eagles), seven Super Bowl championships (with the Steelers winning six and the Eagles one), two NBA championships (both won by the 76ers), and seven Stanley Cup championships (with the Penguins winning five and Flyers winning two).

With five professional sports teams and some of the most passionate sports fans in the nation, Philadelphia is often described as the nation's best sports city.

In baseball, in addition to its two MLB franchises, Pennsylvania has minor league and semi-pro sports teams: the Triple-A baseball Lehigh Valley IronPigs and the Scranton/Wilkes-Barre RailRiders of the Triple-A East; the Double-A baseball Altoona Curve, Erie SeaWolves, Harrisburg Senators, and Reading Fightin Phils of the Double-A Northeast; the collegiate summer baseball State College Spikes and Williamsport Crosscutters of the MLB Draft League; the independent baseball Lancaster Barnstormers and York Revolution of the Atlantic League of Professional Baseball; the independent baseball Washington Wild Things of the Frontier League; the Erie BayHawks of the NBA G League; the Lehigh Valley Phantoms, Wilkes-Barre/Scranton Penguins, and Hershey Bears of the American Hockey League; the Reading Royals and of the ECHL; and the Philadelphia Soul of the Arena Football League. Among them, these teams have accumulated 12 triple and double-A baseball league titles (RailRiders 1, Senators 6, Fightin Phils 4Curve 1), 3Arena Bowl Championships (Soul), and 11 Calder Cups (Bears).

The first World Series between the Boston Americans (which later became the Boston Red Sox) and Pittsburgh Pirates was played in Pittsburgh in 1903. Since 1959, the Little League World Series has been held each August in South Williamsport near where Little League Baseball was founded in Williamsport.

With the addition of the Philadelphia Union of the MLS, Pennsylvania now boasts three teams that are eligible to compete for the Lamar Hunt U.S. Open Cup annually. The other two teams are Philadelphia Union II and the Pittsburgh Riverhounds. Both of the United Soccer League (USL). Within the American Soccer Pyramid, the MLS takes the first tier while the USL-2 claims the third tier.

Arnold Palmer, one of the 20th century's most accomplished professional golfers, comes from Latrobe, and Jim Furyk, a current PGA member grew up near in Lancaster. PGA tournaments in Pennsylvania include the 84 Lumber Classic played at Nemacolin Woodlands Resort, in Farmington and the Northeast Pennsylvania Classic played at Glenmaura National Golf Club in Moosic.

Philadelphia is home to LOVE Park across from City Hall, a popular location for skateboarding and host to ESPN's X Games in 2001 and 2002.

Motorsports
In motorsports, the Mario Andretti dynasty of race drivers hails from Nazareth in the Lehigh Valley. Pennsylvania racetracks include Jennerstown Speedway in Jennerstown, Lake Erie Speedway in North East, Lernerville Speedway in Sarver, and Pocono Raceway in Long Pond, which is home to two NASCAR Cup Series races and an IndyCar Series race. The state is also home to Maple Grove Raceway, near Reading, which hosts major National Hot Rod Association-sanctioned drag racing events each year.

There are also two motocross race tracks that host a round of the AMA Toyota Motocross Championships in Pennsylvania. High Point Raceway is located in Mount Morris, Pennsylvania, and Steel City is located in Delmont, Pennsylvania.

Horse racing courses in Pennsylvania consist of The Meadows near Pittsburgh, Mohegan Pennsylvania in Wilkes-Barre, and Harrah's Philadelphia in Chester, which offer harness racing, and Penn National Race Course in Grantville, Parx Racing (formerly Philadelphia Park) in Bensalem, and Presque Isle Downs near Erie, which offer thoroughbred racing. Smarty Jones, the 2004 Kentucky Derby and Preakness Stakes winner, had Philadelphia Park as his home course.

College sports
In college football, three  Pennsylvania universities compete in NCAA Division I, the highest level of sanctioned collegiate play in the sport: Penn State in the Big Ten Conference, Pitt in the Atlantic Coast Conference, and Temple in the American Athletic Conference.

Over their respective college football histories, Penn State claims two national championships (1982 and 1986) and seven undefeated seasons (1887, 1912, 1968, 1969, 1973, 1986, and 1994) and Pitt has won nine national championships (1915, 1916, 1918, 1929, 1931, 1934, 1936, 1937, and 1976) and had eight undefeated seasons (1904, 1910, 1915, 1916, 1917, 1920, 1937, and 1976). Penn State plays its home games at Beaver Stadium, a 106,572-capacity stadium that is the second largest stadium in the nation; the team is coached by James Franklin. Pitt plays its home games at Acrisure Stadium, a 68,400-capacity stadium it shares with the Pittsburgh Steelers; the team is coached by Pat Narduzzi. Over their respective histories, four additional Pennsylvania universities and colleges have won national college football championships: Lafayette in Easton (1896), Villanova in Villanova (2009), Penn in Philadelphia (1895, 1897, 1904, and 1908), and Washington & Jefferson in Washington (1921).

In college basketball, five Philadelphia and Philadelphia-area universities, collectively known as the Big Five, have a rich tradition in NCAA Division I basketball. National titles in college basketball have been won by La Salle (1954), Temple (1938), Penn (1920 and 1921), Pitt (1928 and 1930), and Villanova (1985, 2016, and 2018).

Pennsylvania has several universities and colleges known as national leaders in college wrestling. Penn State, coached by Cael Sanderson, has won ten NCAA Division I Wrestling Championships in its history, second most among all universities and colleges after Oklahoma State. Lehigh in Bethlehem has had 28 NCAA Division I individual champions over its history.

Food

In 2008, author Sharon Hernes Silverman called Pennsylvania the snack food capital of the world. It leads all other states in the manufacture of pretzels and potato chips. The Sturgis Pretzel House introduced the pretzel to America, and companies like Anderson Bakery Company, Intercourse Pretzel Factory, and Snyder's of Hanover are leading manufacturers in the Commonwealth. Two of the three companies that define the U.S. potato chip industry are based in Pennsylvania: Utz Quality Foods, which started making chips in Hanover, Pennsylvania, in 1921 and Wise Foods, which started making chips in Berwick also in 1921. The third, Frito-Lay is part of PepsiCo, and is based in Plano, Texas. Other companies such as Herr's Snacks, Martin's Potato Chips, Snyder's of Berlin (not associated with Snyder's of Hanover), Middleswarth Potato Chips (in Middleburg) and Troyer Farms Potato Products are popular chip manufacturers.

The U.S. chocolate industry is centered in Hershey, Pennsylvania, with Mars, Godiva, and Wilbur Chocolate Company nearby, and smaller manufacturers such as Asher's in Souderton, and Gertrude Hawk Chocolates of Dunmore. Other notable companies include Just Born in Bethlehem, Pennsylvania, makers of Hot Tamales, Mike and Ikes, the Easter favorite marshmallow Peeps, and Boyer Brothers of Altoona, Pennsylvania, which is well known for its Mallo Cups. Auntie Anne's Pretzels began as a market-stand in Downingtown, Pennsylvania, and now has corporate headquarters in Lancaster City. Traditional Pennsylvania Dutch foods include chicken potpie, ham potpie, schnitz un knepp (dried apples, ham, and dumplings), fasnachts (raised doughnuts), scrapple, pretzels, bologna, chow-chow, and Shoofly pie. Martin's Famous Pastry Shoppe, headquartered in Chambersburg, Pennsylvania, specializes in potato bread, another traditional Pennsylvania Dutch food. D.G. Yuengling & Son, America's oldest brewery, has been brewing beer in Pottsville since 1829.

Among the regional foods associated with Philadelphia are cheesesteaks, hoagies, soft pretzels, Italian water ice, Irish potato candy, scrapple, Tastykake, and strombolis. In Pittsburgh, tomato ketchup was improved by Henry John Heinz from 1876 to the early 20th century. Famous to a lesser extent than Heinz ketchup is the Pittsburgh's Primanti Brothers Restaurant sandwiches, pierogies, and city chicken. Outside of Scranton, in Old Forge, there are dozens of Italian restaurants specializing in pizza made unique by thick, light crust, and American cheese. Erie also has its share of unique foods, including Greek sauce and sponge candy. Sauerkraut along with pork and mashed potatoes is a traditional meal on New Year's Day in Pennsylvania; its tradition began with the Pennsylvania Dutch who believe the meal leads to good luck in the new year to come.

Nicknames
Pennsylvania has been known as the Keystone State since 1802, based in part on its central location among the original Thirteen Colonies from which the United States was formed, and in part because of the important founding American documents, including the Declaration of Independence and U.S. Constitution, that were signed and ratified in Pennsylvania. It has also been a keystone state economically with both manufacturing common to the North, including wares as Conestoga wagons and rifles, and also agriculture common to the South, including feed, fiber, food, and tobacco.

During the colonial era, Pennsylvania carried the nickname the Quaker State in recognition of Quaker William Penn's First Frame of Government constitution for the Province of Pennsylvania that guaranteed liberty of conscience. Penn knew of the hostility Quakers faced when they opposed religious ritual, taking oaths, violence, war, and military service, and what they viewed as ostentatious frippery.

The Coal State, The Oil State, and The Steel State were each adopted nicknames when those respective industries were, at various times during the 19th and 20th centuries, the state's largest respective industries. The State of Independence appears on several present road signs entering Pennsylvania from neighboring states.

Notable people

Sister regions

  Matanzas Province, Cuba
  Rhône-Alpes, France

See also

 Index of Pennsylvania-related articles
 Outline of Pennsylvania

Notes

References

Citations

Sources

Web sources

Books

External links

 Official state government site
 Official state tourism site
 

 
1787 establishments in the United States
Articles containing video clips
Contiguous United States
Mid-Atlantic states
Northeastern United States
States and territories established in 1787
States of the East Coast of the United States
States of the United States